Jay Russell Oliver (born April 26, 1959) is an American jazz musician (piano, keyboards and synths), composer, record producer, programmer and engineer. He began his professional music career at the age of 19 as the youngest member of Maynard Ferguson's band. His later credits include: Sheryl Crow, The Eagles, Jimmy Buffett, Wynonna Judd, Glenn Frey, Peabo Bryson, Chick Corea, Dave Weckl, Russ Kunkel, Jay Graydon, AO Music, Celine Dion and many others.

Oliver resides in Los Angeles, where he has worked extensively in music composition and production, ranging from jazz fusion and world music to soundtracks to session work of all kinds.

At the beginning of 2011, after many years of research and field test studies involving the use of sound from a clinical perspective, Oliver founded a company called SmartWav. The company specializes in the use of proprietary tonal, pitch and rhythm mapping technologies that specifically aid infants in areas of brain development and issues of post-womb insomnia.

Early career

Dave Weckl
Oliver and Dave Weckl grew up together in St. Louis where they explored a prolific jazz fusion style. A few years later in Los Angeles, after partnering on Weckl's first three solo releases, they formed The Dave Weckl Band, co-producing two albums.

Sheryl Crow
Oliver was a top local producer  in his St. Louis studio when first introduced to a young Sheryl Crow, who at the time was a school teacher and aspiring singer. Oliver eventually began using Crow in recording sessions and featured her in several jingles. She and Oliver moved to Los Angeles within a few years of each other and began co-writing songs that eventually landed Crow a publishing contract and recording deal with A&M Records. Some of those songs were recorded by Celine Dion, Wynonna Judd and others.

Glenn Frey
In the nineties Oliver was hired as Glenn Frey's keyboardist, co-producer and co-writer. Oliver also has production credit with Elliot Scheiner for the Eagles album Hell Freezes Over as well as their live album New Millennium.

Jimmy Buffett
In the late 1980s, Oliver was asked by producer Elliot Scheiner to begin co-writing songs with Jimmy Buffett. He co-wrote the Buffett albums Off to See the Lizard and Barometer Soup, then briefly toured as member of his Coral Reefer Band.

World music 
In 1996, Oliver began co-producing with Richard Gannaway, the pan-cultural project AO Music, resulting in journeys to Indonesia, Ireland, the People's Republic of Georgia, South Africa, India, Nepal and a special invitation to China, where they were asked by the Beijing Olympic Committee to compose theme music for the 2008 Summer Olympics. AO Music album releases have won prestigious international awards and held strong chart position since 2000 (Zone Music Reporter).

Credits 
 Steve Smith, Fiafiaga (Celebration)  (Guitar, Keyboards, Mixing, Producer) 1988
 Jimmy Buffett, Off to See the Lizard (Percussion, Keyboards, Composer) 1989
 Original soundtrack, Arachnophobia" (Keyboards) 1990
 Chick Corea, "Inside Out" (Synthesizer, Programming) 1990
 Dave Weckl, "Master Plan" (Engineer, Arranger, Programming, Guitar, Producer, Sound Effects, Keyboards, Synthesizer) 1990
 Jimmy Buffett, "Feeding Frenzy" (Keyboards) 1990
 Dave Weckl, "Heads Up" (Programming, Mixing, Associate Producer, Composer, Piano, Keyboards, Synthesizer, Producer, Engineer) 1992
 Glenn Frey, "Strange Weather" (Instrumentation, Programming, Keyboards, Multi Instruments) 1992
 Jay Graydon, "Airplay for the Planet" (Musician, Synthesizer Arrangements) 1993
 Glenn Frey, "Glenn Frey Live" (Keyboards) 1993
 Dave Weckl, "Hardwired" (Composer, Engineer, Associate Producer, Organ, Synth Bass, Keyboards, Programming, Synthesizer, Piano, Mixing) 1994
 Eagles, "Hell Freezes Over" (Horn Arrangements, Keyboards, String Arrangements) 1994
 Peabo Bryson, "Through the Fire" (Synth Percussion, Synth Drums) 1994
 Tiger & the Helix, "Peace Face" (Keyboards, Composer, Mixing Engineer, Producer) 1994
 Glenn Frey, "Solo Collection" (Synth Bass, Synth Drums, Keyboards, Multi Instruments, Arranger) 1995
 Jimmy Buffett, "Barometer Soup" (Composer, Arranger, Horn Arrangements, Programming, Keyboards) 1995
 Phyllis Hyman, "I Refuse to be Lonely" (Engineer, Keyboards) 1995
 Peter Mayer, "Green Eyed Radio" (Strings, Mixing, Publishing, Keyboards, Percussion, Piano, Arrangement Preparations) 1996
 Dave Weckl, "Rhythm of the Soul" (Engineer, Producer, Keyboards, Mixing, Composer) 1998
 Dave Weckl, "Synergy" (Composer) 1999
 Eagles, "Selected Works: 1972-1999" (Keyboards, Engineer, Producer) 2000
 Aomusic - "Grow Wild" (Synthesizer, Sampling, Composer, Producer, Mixing, Keyboards) 2000
 Glenn Frey, "20th Century Masters - The Millennium" (Keyboards, Programming, Arranger) 2000
 Glenn Frey, "Classic Glenn Frey" (Composer) 2001
 Dave Weckl, "Zone" (Associate Producer, Keyboards) 2001
 Eagles, "The Very Best Of" (String Arrangements, Horn Arrangements, Keyboards) 2003
 Jimmy Buffett, "Meet Me in Margaritaville: The Ultimate Collection" (Composer) 2003
 Chick Corea, "Rediscovery On Grp: Chick Corea Family" (Synthesizer Horn, Guitar Programming, Synthesizer Programming, Programming, Keyboards, Composer, Synthesizer, Organ, Soloist, Sound Effects) 2004
 Eagles, "Farewell Tour: Live from Melbourne" (Composers) 2005
 Wynonna Judd, "Wynonna Collector's Edition Tin" (Composer) 2008
 Russ Kunkel, "Zone" (Mixing, Engineer, Keyboards, Producer, Audio Production, Programmings) 2008
 Aomusic - "Twirl" (Synthesizer, Sampling, Composer, Producer, Mixing, Keyboards) 2009
 Aomusic - "...and Love Rages on!" (Synthesizer, Sampling, Composer, Producer, Mixing, Keyboards) 2011
 Aomusic - "Hokulea" (2013)
 Aomusic - "Asha" (2017)
 Aomusic - "Kutumba" (2021)

 Band/ensemble albums 
 Dave Weckl - Master Plan 1990
 Dave Weckl - Heads Up 1992
 Dave Weckl - Hardwired 1994
 Dave Weckl - Rhythm of the Soul 1998
 Dave Weckl - Synergy 1999
 Aomusic - Grow Wild 2000
 Aomusic - Twirl 2009
 Aomusic - ...and Love Rages on! 2011
 Aomusic - Hokulea 2013
 Aomusic - Asha 2017
 Aomusic - Kutumba'' 2021

References

External links 
 
 SmartWav website
 Aomusic website

1959 births
Living people
Musicians from St. Louis
Record producers from Missouri
Coral Reefer Band members
Jazz musicians from Missouri